In geometry, a hyperboloid of revolution, sometimes called a circular hyperboloid, is the surface generated by rotating a hyperbola around one of its principal axes. A hyperboloid is the surface obtained from a hyperboloid of revolution by deforming it by means of directional scalings, or more generally, of an affine transformation.

A hyperboloid is a quadric surface, that is, a surface defined as the zero set of a polynomial of degree two in three variables. Among quadric surfaces, a hyperboloid is characterized by not being a cone or a cylinder, having a center of symmetry, and intersecting many planes into hyperbolas. A hyperboloid has three pairwise perpendicular axes of symmetry, and three pairwise perpendicular planes of symmetry.

Given a hyperboloid, one can choose a Cartesian coordinate system such that the hyperboloid is defined by one of the following equations:
 
or

The coordinate axes are axes of symmetry of the hyperboloid and the origin is the center of symmetry of the hyperboloid. In any case, the hyperboloid is asymptotic to the cone of the equations:

One has a hyperboloid of revolution if and only if  Otherwise, the axes are uniquely defined (up to the exchange of the x-axis and the y-axis).

There are two kinds of hyperboloids. In the first case ( in the right-hand side of the equation): a one-sheet hyperboloid, also called a hyperbolic hyperboloid. It is a connected surface, which has a negative Gaussian curvature at every point. This implies near every point the intersection of the hyperboloid and its tangent plane at the point consists of two branches of curve that have distinct tangents at the point. In the case of the one-sheet hyperboloid, these branches of curves are lines and thus the one-sheet hyperboloid is a doubly ruled surface.

In the second case ( in the right-hand side of the equation): a two-sheet hyperboloid, also called an elliptic hyperboloid. The surface has two connected components and a positive Gaussian curvature at every point. The surface is convex in the sense that the tangent plane at every point intersects the surface only in this point.

Parametric representations 

Cartesian coordinates for the hyperboloids can be defined, similar to spherical coordinates, keeping the azimuth angle , but changing inclination  into hyperbolic trigonometric functions:

One-surface hyperboloid: 

Two-surface hyperboloid: 

The following parametric representation includes hyperboloids of one sheet, two sheets, and their common boundary cone, each with the -axis as the axis of symmetry:

For  one obtains a hyperboloid of one sheet, 
For  a hyperboloid of two sheets, and 
For  a double cone.

One can obtain a parametric representation of a hyperboloid with a different coordinate axis as the axis of symmetry by shuffling the position of the  term to the appropriate component in the equation above.

Generalised equations

The one-sheet hyperboloid has two positive eigenvalues and one negative eigenvalue. The two-sheet hyperboloid has one positive eigenvalue and two negative eigenvalues.

Properties

Hyperboloid of one sheet

Lines on the surface 
A hyperboloid of one sheet contains two pencils of lines. It is a doubly ruled surface. 
If the hyperboloid has the equation
  then the lines

are contained in the surface.

This property is called Wren's theorem. The more common generation of a one-sheet hyperboloid of revolution is rotating a hyperbola around its semi-minor axis (see picture; rotating the hyperbola around its other axis gives a two-sheet hyperbola of revolution).

A hyperboloid of one sheet is projectively equivalent to a hyperbolic paraboloid.

Plane sections 
For simplicity the plane sections of the unit hyperboloid with equation  are considered. Because a hyperboloid in general position is an affine image of the unit hyperboloid, the result applies to the general case, too.

A plane with a slope less than 1 (1 is the slope of the lines on the hyperboloid) intersects  in an ellipse,
A plane with a slope equal to 1 containing the origin intersects  in a pair of parallel lines,
A plane with a slope equal 1 not containing the origin intersects  in a parabola,
A tangential plane intersects  in a pair of intersecting lines,
A non-tangential plane with a slope greater than 1 intersects  in a hyperbola.
Obviously, any one-sheet hyperboloid of revolution contains circles. This is also true, but less obvious, in the general case (see circular section).

Hyperboloid of two sheets 

The hyperboloid of two sheets does not contain lines. The discussion of plane sections can be performed for the unit hyperboloid of two sheets with equation
. 
which can be generated by a rotating hyperbola around one of its axes (the one that cuts the hyperbola)

A plane with slope less than 1 (1 is the slope of the asymptotes of the generating hyperbola) intersects  either in an ellipse or in a point or not at all,
A plane with slope equal to 1 containing the origin (midpoint of the hyperboloid) does not intersect  , 
A plane with slope equal to 1 not containing the origin intersects  in a parabola, 
A plane with slope greater than 1 intersects  in a hyperbola.
Obviously, any two-sheet hyperboloid of revolution contains circles. This is also true, but less obvious, in the general case (see circular section).

Remark: A hyperboloid of two sheets is projectively equivalent to a sphere.

Other properties

Symmetries 
The hyperboloids with equations 

are
pointsymmetric to the origin,
symmetric to the coordinate planes and

Curvature 
Whereas the Gaussian curvature of a hyperboloid of one sheet is negative, that of a two-sheet hyperboloid is positive. In spite of its positive curvature, the hyperboloid of two sheets with another suitably chosen metric can also be used as a model for hyperbolic geometry.

In more than three dimensions
Imaginary hyperboloids are frequently found in mathematics of higher dimensions. For example, in a pseudo-Euclidean space one has the use of a quadratic form:
  
When  is any constant, then the part of the space given by

is called a hyperboloid.

As an example, consider the following passage:

Hyperboloid structures 

One-sheeted hyperboloids are used in construction, with the structures called hyperboloid structures. A hyperboloid is a doubly ruled surface; thus, it can be built with straight steel beams, producing a strong structure at a lower cost than other methods. Examples include cooling towers, especially of power stations, and many other structures.

Relation to the sphere
In 1853 William Rowan Hamilton published his Lectures on Quaternions which included presentation of biquaternions.  The following passage from page 673 shows how Hamilton uses biquaternion algebra and vectors from quaternions to produce hyperboloids from the equation of a sphere:
The equation of the sphere then breaks up into the system of the two following,
, ;
.
Hence it is easy to infer that if we assume , where  is a vector in a given position, the new real vector  will terminate on the surface of a double-sheeted and equilateral hyperboloid; and that if, on the other hand, we assume , then the locus of the extremity of the real vector  will be an equilateral but single-sheeted hyperboloid. The study of these two hyperboloids is, therefore, in this way connected very simply, through biquaternions, with the study of the sphere; ...

A modern view of the unification of the sphere and hyperboloid uses the idea of a conic section as a slice of a quadratic form. Instead of a conical surface, one requires conical hypersurfaces in four-dimensional space with points  determined by quadratic forms. First consider the conical hypersurface
 and
 which is a hyperplane.
Then  is the sphere with radius . On the other hand, the conical hypersurface
 provides that  is a hyperboloid.

See also

 de Sitter space
 Ellipsoid
 List of surfaces
 Paraboloid / Hyperbolic paraboloid
 Regulus
 Rotation of axes
 
 Translation of axes

References

 Wilhelm Blaschke (1948) Analytische Geometrie, Kapital V: "Quadriken", Wolfenbutteler Verlagsanstalt.
 David A. Brannan, M. F. Esplen, & Jeremy J Gray (1999) Geometry, pp. 39–41 Cambridge University Press. 
 H. S. M. Coxeter (1961) Introduction to Geometry, p. 130, John Wiley & Sons.

External links

 
 

Geometric shapes
Surfaces
Quadrics
Articles containing video clips